Hugh Alexander McDowell (31 July 1953 – 6 November 2018) was an English cellist best known for his membership of the Electric Light Orchestra (ELO) and related acts.

Career
McDowell started playing the cello at the age of four-and-a-half; by the age of 10, he had won a scholarship to the Yehudi Menuhin School. Only one year later he made his first professional appearance in Benjamin Britten's The Turn of the Screw, in which he sang. Later he attended Kingsway College of Further Education, the Royal College of Music and the Guildhall School of Music and Drama. He played with the London Youth Symphony Orchestra, the London Schools Symphony Orchestra, National Youth Orchestra and London Youth Chamber Orchestra, until he was persuaded by Wilf Gibson to join The Electric Light Orchestra.

Electric Light Orchestra career
McDowell performed with the first live line-up of ELO in 1972 while only 19 years old, but left with founding member Roy Wood and horn player/keyboardist Bill Hunt to perform with the group Wizzard. During his time in Wizzard, he played both cello and Moog synthesizer, but returned to ELO in 1973 to replace Colin Walker. McDowell's return was partly motivated by a desire to play more cello and less keyboards as he had done with Wizzard. He remained with the group until Jeff Lynne removed the string players from the line-up. McDowell appeared in promotional videos for the Discovery album, despite not having played on the record. He performed with Electric Light Orchestra Part II in 1991.

Post-ELO life

In 1980, McDowell played on the album Gift Wrapped by former ELO cellist Melvyn Gale, who had founded the group Wilson Gale & Co. 

For a short time around 1982, he was a member of Radio Stars and recorded the single "My Mother Said" with the group.

Reference : https://www.discogs.com/fr/release/1368063-Asia-Phoenix

McDowell also arranged and recorded for numerous pop, rock, and jazz-fusion albums, as well as collaborating in dance, film, and theatre projects.

He was involved with computer programming and published a music composition program called Fractal Music Composer in 1992. He developed a suite of four programs: Mandelbrot Set Composer, Julia Set Composer, Mandelbrot Zoom and Play Midi.

Death
McDowell died of cancer on 6 November 2018.

References

External links
Entry at discogs.com

1953 births
2018 deaths
British rock cellists
British pop cellists
People from Hampstead
Electric Light Orchestra members
English classical cellists
English cellists
English classical musicians
Alumni of the Royal College of Music
20th-century classical musicians
Deaths from cancer in the United Kingdom
Wizzard members